Zuruahá (also called Suruaha, Suruwaha, Zuruaha, Índios do Coxodoá ) is an Arawan language spoken in Brazil by about 130 people.

Zuruahá is mentioned in Kaufman (1994) from personal communication from Dan Everett. He made first contact with the community (a 3-day hike from Dení territory in Amazonas state) in 1980. The language had not been studied as of 1994, but seems most similar to Deni.

References

External links 
"Suruahá" in the South American Phonological Inventory Database
"Hakani," information about a popular hoax film about the Zuruahã, Survival International

Arawan languages
Languages of Brazil
Endangered Arawan languages